Reuben Daniel Hazell (born 24 April 1979) is an English former professional footballer who played as a defender.

Club career
Hazell started his career as a youth player with Aston Villa before playing for Tranmere Rovers, Torquay United, Kidderminster Harriers and Chesterfield, where he scored once against Swansea City. Whilst at Tranmere he played in the 2000 Football League Cup Final, and scored one league goal in a 2–1 win over Portsmouth in March 2000.

He joined Oldham Athletic in September 2007. He was appointed the club's vice-captain at the start of the 2010–11 season before being promoted to club captain after the departure of Sean Gregan.

At the end of the 2010–11 season he declined the offer of a new contract from Oldham and he left the club in June 2011. He subsequently joined Shrewsbury Town ahead of the start of pre-season training on a two-year deal. However, he was missed most of the season after suffering cruciate ligament damage in a match against Torquay United as a result of a tackle by Torquay striker Rene Howe, whom Hazell later criticised in the Shropshire Star. On 15 October 2012, Hazell left Shrewsbury after his contract was terminated by mutual consent.

Coaching career
Hazell managed the Panjab football team at the 2018 ConIFA World Football Cup.

References

External links

Reuben Hazell profile from Oldham Athletic

1979 births
Living people
Aston Villa F.C. players
Tranmere Rovers F.C. players
Torquay United F.C. players
Kidderminster Harriers F.C. players
Chesterfield F.C. players
Oldham Athletic A.F.C. players
Shrewsbury Town F.C. players
Footballers from Birmingham, West Midlands
English people of Jamaican descent
Black British sportspeople
English Football League players
Association football defenders
English footballers